Nigel Kim Darroch, Baron Darroch of Kew,  (born 30 April 1954) is a former British diplomat. He served as the British Ambassador to the United States between January 2016 and December 2019, and previously as National Security Adviser and UK Permanent Representative to the European Union.

On 10 July 2019, following the leak of diplomatic cables in which he had been critical of the Trump presidential administration, he resigned from his position as HM Ambassador in Washington. Darroch concluded his post in December 2019 upon retirement from HM Diplomatic Service after a career spanning 40 years of public service.

Early life
Nigel Kim Darroch was born in the village of South Stanley in County Durham, England, on 30 April 1954, to Alastair Macphee Darroch and Enid Darroch. He was educated at Abingdon School and at Durham University (Hatfield College), from where he graduated with a bachelor's degree in zoology in 1975. Darroch was an avid fives player in his youth, representing his school and later Durham University.

Career 

Darroch joined the Foreign and Commonwealth Office (FCO) in 1976. He was appointed to the Diplomatic Service in 1980 to serve as a First Secretary in Tokyo from 1980 to 1984. He served in a number of posts, including as desk officer for the Channel Tunnel project and co-secretary of the UK-French Channel Tunnel Treaty Group, as private secretary to David Mellor and then The Lord Glenarthur as the FCO's Minister of State from 1987 to 1989, and as Counsellor for External Affairs at the British Permanent Representative to the European Union for a year before being promoted to Director as head of the FCO's press office in 1998.

In 2000, Darroch moved back to policy work as Director of EU Comd, and in 2003 promoted further to be Director-General, Europe. In 2004, he transferred to 10 Downing Street, as Head of the Cabinet Office European Secretariat, where he served as the Prime Minister's principal advisor on European affairs. After three years, Darroch was appointed to replace John Grant in Brussels, as British Permanent Representative to the European Union in 2007 for a four-year term.

On 24 June 2011, it was announced that Darroch would replace Peter Ricketts as National Security Advisor in January 2012, with Jon Cunliffe selected as Darroch's replacement as Permanent Representative to the European Union.

Ambassador to the United States

On 7 July 2015, the Foreign Office announced that Darroch would be replaced by Mark Lyall Grant in September 2015. On 20 August 2015, the Foreign Office announced that Darroch's new role would be as the Ambassador to the United States, replacing Peter Westmacott on 28 January 2016.

In November 2016, following the US election, a memo by Darroch to Prime Minister Theresa May was leaked in which he said the President-elect of the United States, Donald Trump, could be influenced by the British government. The following week, Trump tweeted that Nigel Farage should serve as British ambassador to the United States. Downing Street said that there was no vacancy and that the UK had "an excellent ambassador to the US". Darroch was in London the next day for consultations with May that were said to have been long-planned.

Cables leak and resignation
On 7 July 2019, secret diplomatic cables from Darroch to the British government, dating from 2017 to 2019, were leaked to Steven Edginton, a 19-year-old "freelance journalist" and Brexit Party employee.  (The most controversial item, however, according to Darroch's book, 'Collateral Damage', was not a cable but a confidential letter sent directly to the National Security Advisor, Mark Sedwill) where Darroch assessed the Trump administration as "inept and insecure". In response, Nigel Farage said Darroch was "totally unsuitable" for office, and Trump tweeted that Darroch was "not liked or well thought of within the US" and that "we will no longer deal with him". The Prime Minister, Theresa May, expressed support for Darroch and ordered a leak inquiry. It led to a criminal investigation by Scotland Yard.

On 10 July, Darroch resigned as Ambassador to the United States. He wrote that "the current situation is making it impossible for me to carry out my role as I would like". Previously, Boris Johnson, the frontrunner in the election to replace May, had declined to publicly support Darroch. Consensus among political commentators in the UK was that this made Darroch's position untenable. In the House of Commons, both May and the leader of the opposition, Jeremy Corbyn, praised Darroch's service and deplored that he had to resign under pressure from the United States. A spokesman for the Prime Minister said that it was an ambassador's job to provide "an honest and unvarnished view" of the US administration. Darroch remained in the post until the end of the year.

Later career
In 2020, Darroch wrote Collateral Damage: Britain, America and Europe in the Age of Trump.

On 19 September 2021, Darroch became Chairperson of non-partisan, internationalist campaign group, Best for Britain.

Honours
Darroch was appointed a Companion of Order of St Michael and St George (CMG) in the 1997 New Year Honours, and promoted to Knight Commander of the same order (KCMG) in the 2008 Birthday Honours. 

He was nominated as a life peer in Theresa May's 2019 Resignation Honours List. He was created Baron Darroch of Kew, of St Mawes in the County of Cornwall on 11 November 2019.  He made his maiden speech in the House of Lords on 26 November 2020, with a speech on the UK-Japan Comprehensive Economic Partnership Agreement.

Personal life
In 1978, Darroch married Vanessa, who was a teacher at the British International School of Washington while her husband was ambassador to the United States. They have two children: Simon, a paleontologist based at Vanderbilt University who also studied at Durham, and Georgina, a botanist at Kew Gardens.

In 2020, The Times reported on Durroch's alleged "passionate affair [lasting] at least several months" with a US journalist in 2018. The journalist denied receiving secret information from the ambassador.

See also
 List of Old Abingdonians
 List of Durham University people
 List of heads of missions of the United Kingdom

References

External links
 UK Government press release announcing Darroch's appointment to UKREP
 

1954 births
People from Stanley, County Durham
Living people
People educated at Abingdon School
Alumni of Hatfield College, Durham
Crossbench life peers
Diplomatic peers
Knights Commander of the Order of St Michael and St George
Permanent Representatives of the United Kingdom to the European Union
Ambassadors of the United Kingdom to the United States
Life peers created by Elizabeth II